Triodopsis is a genus of air-breathing land snails, terrestrial pulmonate gastropod mollusks in the family Polygyridae.

Species
Species within the genus Triodopsis include:
 Triodopsis anteridon
 Triodopsis discoidea (Pilsbry, 1904)
 Triodopsis hopetonensis (Shuttleworth, 1852) - magnolia three-tooth, magnolia threetooth
 Triodopsis juxtidens (Pilsbry, 1894)
 Triodopsis occidentalis (Pilsbry & Ferriss, 1894) - western three-toothed land snail
 Triodopsis pendula Hubricht, 1952
 Triodopsis picea
 Triodopsis platysayoides (Brooks, 1933) - flat-spired three-toothed snail
 Triodopsis rugosa
 Triodopsis tridentata (Say, 1816) - northern three-tooth, northern threetooth

References

External links 
 

Polygyridae
Taxa named by Constantine Samuel Rafinesque
Taxonomy articles created by Polbot